Palmietfontein Airport was an airport situated to the south of Johannesburg (Katlehong), South Africa, from 1945 to 1952.

Latitude: -26° 20' 7.20" S
Longitude: 28° 08' 28.80" E

History

Palmietfontein Airport was a wartime air force base which was converted to a temporary airport to serve Johannesburg whilst the new airport, Jan Smuts Airport (now O. R. Tambo International Airport), was being built. The airport serving Johannesburg at the time, Rand Airport, was unable to accommodate the size of aircraft to be operated on a new service to Great Britain. In 1948, South African Airways moved its terminal to Palmietfontein Airport.

Several historical flights terminated at Palmietfontein Airport. En-route stops were made at Perth, Cocos Islands and Mauritius. The objective, to establish viable air links between South Africa and Australia, had been accomplished.
The world's first passenger jet service took place on 3 May 1952 when a BOAC de Havilland Comet 1 landed at Palmietfontein on a flight from the UK.

Airport layout

There were three runways, the relative positions of which formed a triangle. Both 17/35 and 04/22 were tarred; 13/31 was grass. The apron and control tower were situated to the west of runway 04/22. The information is derived from an old map and airport layout diagram courtesy of E. Du Plessis.

Aircraft types that operated to and from Palmietfontein

 Douglas DC-3
 Lockheed Lodestar
 Lockheed Constellation
 de Havilland Comet
 Avro Lancastrian
 Handley Page Hermes

Accidents and Incidents

Accidents at the airport
 On 5 January 1948, a Lockheed 18-08-01 Lodestar, ZS-ASW, was damaged beyond repair when it struck a water drain after running off the runway during the landing rollout.

Aircraft bound to or from Palmietfontein
 On 15 May 1948, a Douglas C-49K (DC-3) ZS-BWY, was en route to Palmietfontein from Stamford Hill Airport, Durban, when it crashed into a hill in bad weather with the loss of all 13 on board.
 On 15 September 1952, a South African Airways Douglas C-47A-30-DL(DC-3) ZS-AVI with 19 occupants was written off when they landed at Carolina after becoming lost on a flight from Livingstone, Zambia to Palmietfontein. The landing occurred at night and the strip was unlighted. There were no fatalities.

Palmietfontein today

Palmietfontein was transformed into a motor racing circuit for the 1956 Rand Grand Prix, which was won by Peter Whitehead. The township of Katlehong was eventually established on the site, although parts of the original runway are still visible on Google Maps to this day.
Latitude: -26° 20' 7.20" S
Longitude: 28° 08' 28.80" E

References

External links
Gooney Bird's Blog
Pictures of Palmietfontein by Etienne Du Plessis

History of South Africa
History of Germiston
Airports in Johannesburg
Defunct airports